Ulric Mathiot is a Seychellois professional football player and manager.

Career
Ulric Mathiot represented the Seychelles national football team as a player at the Indian Ocean Island Games 1990 when the team won the bronze medal.

He went on to coach the national team in 1991 and 2008. He has been the national Technical director of the Seychelles since 2010 and also coached other coaches in his capacity as a FIFA and CAF instructor.

In April 2014, following the resignation of Jan Mak in 2013, he once again became coach of the national team.

Honours
Indian Ocean Island Games: 1
 3rd place: 1990

References

External links
 
 Ulric Mathiot at Soccerpunter.com

Year of birth missing (living people)
Living people
Seychellois footballers
Seychelles international footballers
Seychellois football managers
Seychelles national football team managers
Place of birth missing (living people)
Association footballers not categorized by position